McGaughey and MacGaughey,{mâ gā hē} are Scottish and Irish, (Armagh County Ireland) surnames. They are anglicised forms of the Gaelic Mac Eachaidh, meaning "son of Eochaidh", or "son of Eachaidh". These personal names are composed of a derivative of the Gaelic each, meaning "horse"; the personal names mean "horseman". Notable people with the surname include:

Claude R. McGaughey III
Edward W. McGaughey
Martin McGaughey
Nicholas McGaughey
Neal McCoy (born McGaughey)

See also
 McCaughey

References

Anglicised Irish-language surnames